Kasa Budruk is a village in the Palghar district of Maharashtra, India. It is located in the Vikramgad taluka. In 2015, Krishna Kakdya Bij, a Warli tribal from the village helped exposed a MGNREGA scam.

Demographics 

According to the 2011 census of India, Kasa Budruk has 448 households. The effective literacy rate (i.e. the literacy rate of population excluding children aged 6 and below) is 60.08%.

References 

Villages in Vikramgad taluka